Tamarie Cooper (born September 9, 1970) is an actress and playwright in Houston, Texas who is best known for her work with Infernal Bridegroom Productions and the Catastrophic Theatre. She currently serves as artistic director of the Catastrophic Theatre. She attended Houston's High School for the Performing and Visual Arts.

Cooper is known for the semi-autobiographical musicals she produces annually. Her first, Tamalalia!, was performed on stage at The Orange Show in 1996.

References 

Living people
1970 births
American stage actresses
American dramatists and playwrights
Actresses from Houston
Writers from Houston
High School for the Performing and Visual Arts alumni
21st-century American women